Piyus 

Tirkey (c. 1928 – 25 January 2014) was an Indian politician. He was a five-time Member of Parliament representing the Alipurduars constituency in West Bengal from 1977 to 1996.

References

1920s births
2014 deaths
India MPs 1977–1979
India MPs 1980–1984
India MPs 1984–1989
India MPs 1989–1991
India MPs 1991–1996
Lok Sabha members from West Bengal
People from Jalpaiguri district
Revolutionary Socialist Party (India) politicians
People from Alipurduar district
Indian National Congress politicians from West Bengal